Puerto Rico Highway 807 (PR-807) is a north–south road located in Corozal, Puerto Rico. It begins at Calle San Manuel in downtown Corozal, passing through Dos Bocas barrio until its southern terminus at its junction with PR-805 on the Palos Blancos–Negros line.

Major intersections

See also

 List of highways numbered 807

References

External links
 

807
Roads in Corozal, Puerto Rico